Petar Novaković (d. Belgrade, 1808), known as Petar Čardaklija (Петар Чардаклија), was a diplomat in the First Serbian Uprising. He got his nickname from the village of Čardaklija because his Serbian antecedents  were originally from that region.

Early life 
Petar Novaković was born somewhere on the present-day border of North Macedonia and Albania, possibly in the village of Leunovo, close to Gostivar. His early life is shrouded in mystery. In all probability he ran away from his native village northwards into Serbia (the Sanjak of Smederevo) and started working as an innkeeper in Belgrade.

During the Austro-Turkish War (1787–91), he joined the Serbian Free Corps, volunteer units made out of local Serbs, where he rose to the rank of captain.

After the Austrian retreat, he went to Vienna and then to Buda where he managed to establish close connections in aristocratic circles. His wife was an acquaintance or serving Grand Duchess Alexandra Pavlovna, sister of the Russian emperor Alexander I; princess Alexandra was married to Archduke Joseph, Habsburg governor of Hungary, and lived in Buda. It was in this period that Čardaklija got the title of Rittermeister.

In the First Serbian Uprising 
Čardaklija was keeping in touch with notable Serbs from Hungary hoping for the overthrow of Ottoman power in Serbia. When he learned about Karadjordje’s uprising he sent his wife off to Kharkov and then, in July 1804, he crossed into Serbia and put himself at the service of Karadjordje.

As the Serbian insurrectionists decided to seek international support for their cause they first turned to Vienna but were refused. Čardaklija advised them to petition the Russian tzar since he would be more inclined on supporting them. Čardaklija persuaded Karadjordje that the best way to do this would be to send a delegation to St Petersburg. Karadjordje agreed and on September 1 a Serbian delegation made out of Mateja Nenadović, Jovan Protić and Čardaklija started its journey.

In Saint Petersburg they met with Russian foreign minister Prince Czartoryski, who listened to them and handed their petition to the Tsar. Prince also advised them to form a Serbian government and promised that Russia would help the Serbian cause influencing the Sultan.

The delegation returned to Serbia in mid-December 1804. Čardaklija next took part in the national assembly in Pećani. In April 1805 he was again in a diplomatic delegation (together with Aleksa Lazarević, Jovan Protić, and Stevan Živković) that was sent to Constantinople. However, once there the deputies were ill-treated and had to escape to the Russian consulate and then flee from the city fearing for their lives. Čardaklija and Lazarević embarked on a Russian ship and escaped to Odessa. From there they journeyed to Saint Petersburg and then back to Belgrade.

When in 1807 Russia decided to militarily help the Serbs, Čardaklija (together with Avram Lukić and Jeremeija Gagić) was sent to the HQ of the Russian expeditionary force which was stationed in Wallachia. There they asked for a man that would return with them to Belgrade to act as a Russian plenipotentiary in Serbia; their wish was granted.

Čardaklija resided in Belgrade until his death in 1808. He was buried in Belgrade's Orthodox cathedral church. Speech at his funeral was held by his friend, the famous writer Dositej Obradović, at the time minister of education in Serbia. Obradović also wrote the epitaph on his tombstone in which he glorifies Čardaklija as an "immortal Serb".

Family 
Čardaklija had a brother, Jovan, who also crossed to insurrectionist Serbia and worked as a government clerk until the Ottoman return in 1813. Jovan then fled to Russia with other notable Serbs. That is also where he died.

See also
 List of Serbian Revolutionaries

References

Sources

External links
 Konstantin N. Nenadović, Život i dela Karađorđa i njegovi junaka, vol. 2, Vienna 1884, pp. 43–47

1808 deaths
19th-century Serbian people
People from Gostivar Municipality
Serbian diplomats
People of the First Serbian Uprising
Serbs from the Ottoman Empire
Habsburg Serbs